The Woman Hater (1910) is a short film starring Pearl White and Stuart Holmes.

Plot
A man receives a letter from a girl stating that she does not want a relationship with him anymore. After this, he becomes the "woman hater" referenced in the title.

Production
The film runs at 13 minutes, but is incomplete, and is being preserved by the National Film Preservation Foundation and the New Zealand Film Archive. The film was rediscovered in 2010 in New Zealand.

See also
 List of American films of 1910

References

External links

The Woman Hater at SilentEra

1910 films
1910 short films
American silent short films
American romance films
American black-and-white films
1910s rediscovered films
1910s romance films
Rediscovered American films
Films directed by Joseph A. Golden
1910s American films